Events in the year 2021 in Germany.

Incumbents
President: Frank-Walter Steinmeier 
Chancellor: 
 Angela Merkel (until 8 December 2021)
 Olaf Scholz (from 8 December 2021)

Events

4 January – The COVID-19 lockdown is extended until 31 January.
15/16 January  January 2021 Christian Democratic Union of Germany leadership election
14 March  2021 Baden-Württemberg state election
14 March  2021 Rhineland-Palatinate state election
14 March  2021 Hessian local elections
6 June  2021 Saxony-Anhalt state election
25 June  2021 Würzburg stabbing
12 July  the 2021 European floods began
27 July  2021 Leverkusen explosion
26 September  2021 German federal election
26 September  2021 Berlin state election
26 September  2021 Mecklenburg-Vorpommern state election
4/16 December  December 2021 Christian Democratic Union of Germany leadership election

Deaths  

 3 January – Renate Lasker-Harpprecht, writer and journalist (b. 1924)
 13 January – Bernd Kannenberg, race walker, Olympic champion. (b. 1942)
 13 January – Siegfried Fischbacher, magicians and entertainers (b. 1939)
 30 January – Wilhelm Knabe, ecologist and politician (b. 1923)
 2 February – Heike Fleßner, educationalist (b. 1944)
 23 February – Heinz Hermann Thiele, businessman (b. 1941)
 24 February – Wolfgang Boettcher, cellist (b. 1935)
 16 March – Sabine Schmitz, racing driver and television personality (b. 1969)
 17 March – Gerhard Augustin, music producer (b. 1941)

 25 March – Uta Ranke-Heinemann, theologian (b. 1927)
 26 March – Ursula Happe, swimmer, Olympic champion (b. 1926)
 6 April – Hans Küng, Swiss-born priest and theologian (b. 1928)
 24 April – Christa Ludwig, German soprano (b. 1928)
 2 July – Bill Ramsey, German-American singer (b. 1931)
 17 July – Hermann von Richthofen, German diplomat (b. 1933)

 23 July – Alfred Biolek, German entertainer and television producer  (b. 1934)
 23 July – Klaus Wilhelm Roggenkamp, German mathematician (b. 1940)
 24 July –  Herbert Köfer, German actor, voice artist, and television presenter  (b. 1931)
 4 August – Karl Heinz Bohrer, German essayist (b. 1932)

 12 August – Kurt Biedenkopf, German politician (b. 1930)
 15 August – Gerd Müller, German footballer (b. 1945)
 4 September – Ludwig Haas, German actor (b. 1933)
 4 September – Jörg Schlaich, German structural engineer (b. 1934)
 5 September –  Jan Hecker, German diplomat (b. 1967)
 9 September – Hans Pfann, German athlete (b. 1920)
 15 October – Gerd Ruge, German journalist (b. 1928)
 27 October – Bettina Gaus, German journalist (b. 1956)
 22 November –  Volker Lechtenbrink, German actor (b. 1944)
 3 December – Horst Eckel, German football player (b. 1932)

See also

References

 
2020s in Germany
Years of the 21st century in Germany
Germany
Germany